Oceanosuchus is a genus of pholidosaurid mesoeucrocodylian, a type of marine crocodylomorph.  It is known from a skull and partial skeleton found in early Cenomanian-age rocks from Normandy, France. The rostrum of the skull was relatively short compared to other pholidosaurids. Oceanosuchus was described in 2007 by Hua and colleagues.  The type species is O. boecensis.

References

Late Cretaceous crocodylomorphs of Europe
Late Cretaceous reptiles of Europe
Dyrosaurids
Fossil taxa described in 2007
Prehistoric pseudosuchian genera